Githunguri is an agricultural town in central Kenya's Central Province. It is one of the administrative centres of Kiambu County and home to one of East Africa's largest dairy processing plant Fresha, which is owned by a farmers co-operative, Githunguri Dairy farmers cooperative Society. Most of the financial institutions have a presence in town. They include: TAI Sacco Ltd GDC Sacco, KCB, Family Bank, Equity Bank, Absa Bank, and Cooperative Bank.

The other economic activities include tea, coffee, pig, poultry and horticultural farming.

References 

Populated places in Central Province (Kenya)